Ronald Krauss may refer to:
 Ronald Krauss (medical researcher)
 Ronald Krauss (filmmaker)